Barnacre-with-Bonds is a civil parish in the Wyre district of Lancashire, England.  It contains 24 listed buildings that are recorded in the National Heritage List for England.  All the listed buildings are designated at Grade II, the lowest of the three grades, which is applied to "buildings of national importance and special interest".  The parish contains the settlements of Bonds, Calder Vale, and Bowgreave and is otherwise rural.  The Lancaster Canal, the River Wyre and its tributary the River Calder pass through the parish and many of the bridges crossing them are listed.  Also listed is the aqueduct carrying the canal over the River Wyre.  The other listed buildings include farmhouses and other houses, churches, a Quaker meeting house, a former sawmill, a milestone, and a pump in a farmyard,


Buildings

References

Citations

Sources

Lists of listed buildings in Lancashire
Buildings and structures in the Borough of Wyre